Harri Nyyssönen (born 15 November 1965) is a Finnish former footballer who played at both professional and international levels as a midfielder. His brother is fellow player Kai Nyyssönen.

Career
Born in Mikkeli, Nyyssönen played club football for KuPS, Haka, Lahti and Hämeenlinna.

He also earned five caps for Finland between 1991 and 1992.

External links
 

1965 births
Living people
People from Mikkeli
Finnish footballers
Finland international footballers
FC Lahti players
Association football midfielders
Sportspeople from South Savo